City Railway Station is a proposed Lucknow Metro station in Lucknow.

Route plan/map

References

Lucknow Metro stations